The second season of Ellen, an American television series, began September 21, 1994 and ended on May 17, 1995. It aired on ABC. The region 1 DVD was released on February 22, 2005.

Cast

Main cast
 Ellen DeGeneres as Ellen Morgan
 Joely Fisher as Paige Clark
 Arye Gross as Adam Green
 David Anthony Higgins as Joe Farrell
 Clea Lewis as Audrey Penney

Episodes

References

1994 American television seasons
1995 American television seasons
Ellen (TV series) seasons